The House of Schulenburg is the name of an ancient and influential German noble family that goes back to 13th century. Members of the family held the title of Imperial Count. They played significant political and military role in the history of Germany and Great Britain.

Notable members 
Friedrich Graf von der Schulenburg (1865–1939), German generalmajor during World War I and SS-Obergruppenführer
Fritz-Dietlof von der Schulenburg (1902–1944), German government official and anti-Hitler conspirator
Friedrich-Werner Graf von der Schulenburg (1875–1944), German diplomat and anti-Hitler conspirator
Johann Matthias von der Schulenburg (1661–1747), German mercenary, aristocrat, and Rococo art collector
Melusine von der Schulenburg, Duchess of Kendal (1667–1743), mistress of King George I of Great Britain
Melusina von der Schulenburg, Countess of Walsingham (1693–1778), natural daughter of Melusine von der Schulenburg and George I of Great Britain
Wilibald von Schulenburg (1847–1934), German landscape artist
Wolfardine von Minutoli (born Wolfardine von der Schulenburg) (1794–1864), German Egyptologist and writer

See also
Schulenburg, Texas

Surnames
Brandenburgian nobility
German noble families